East Coast hip hop is a regional subgenre of hip hop music that originated in New York City during the 1970s. Hip hop is recognized to have originated and evolved first in The Bronx, New York City.

In contrast to other styles, East Coast hip hop music has prioritized complex lyrics for attentive listening rather than beats for dancing. The term "East Coast hip hop" more specifically denotes hip hop originating from the East Coast of the Northeastern United States; Southeastern states such as Georgia instead fall under the umbrella of Southern hip hop rather than "East Coast hip hop" while Maryland, the District of Columbia, and Virginia produce East Coast hip hop.

Musical style 
In contrast to the more simplistic rhyme pattern and scheme utilized in older hip hop, hip hop in the late ‘80s developed a stronger emphasis on lyrical dexterity. It also became characterized by multi-syllabic rhymes, complex wordplay, a continuous free-flowing delivery and intricate metaphors. Although East Coast hip hop can vary in sound and style, "aggressive" beats and the combining of samples were common to the subgenre in the mid- to late 1980s. The aggressive and hard-hitting beats of the form were emphasized by such acts as EPMD, Beastie Boys and Public Enemy, while artists such as Eric B. & Rakim, Boogie Down Productions, LL Cool J, Big Daddy Kane, Nas, The Notorious B.I.G. and Slick Rick were noted for their lyrical skill. Lyrical themes throughout the history of East Coast hip hop have ranged from lyrical consciousness by such artists as Public Enemy and A Tribe Called Quest to Mafioso rap themes by rappers such as Raekwon, MF Grimm and Kool G Rap.

History

1973–1986: Emergence

East Coast hip hop is occasionally referred to as New York rap due to its origins and development at block parties thrown in New York City during the 1970s. According to AllMusic, "At the dawn of the hip-hop era, all rap was East Coast rap." Leading up to hip hop, there were spoken-word artists such as the Last Poets who released their debut album in 1970, and Gil Scott-Heron, who gained a wide audience with his 1971 track "The Revolution Will Not Be Televised". These artists combined spoken word and music to create a kind of "proto-rap" vibe. Following this, early artists of hip hop such as DJ Kool Herc, Grandmaster Flash, Afrika Bambaataa, the Sugarhill Gang, Kurtis Blow, Jam Master Jay and Run-DMC, pioneered East Coast hip hop during hip hop's earlier years in the 1970s and 1980s.

1986–1997: Renaissance

As the genre developed, lyrical themes evolved through the work of East Coast artists such as the Native Tongues, a collective of hip hop artists associated with generally positive, Afrocentric themes, and assembled by Afrika Bambaataa. New York-based groups such as De La Soul, Public Enemy, A Tribe Called Quest and the Jungle Brothers also earned recognition for their musical eclecticism. This period from the mid-1980s to mid-1990s has been called the "golden age" of hip hop. Although East Coast hip hop was more popular throughout the late 1980s, N.W.A's Straight Outta Compton (released in the summer of 1988) presented the toughened sound of West Coast hip hop, which was accompanied by gritty, street-level subject matter. Later in 1992, Dr. Dre's G-funk record The Chronic would introduce West Coast hip hop to the mainstream. Along with a combined ability to keep its primary function as party music, the West Coast form of hip hop became a dominant force during the early 1990s. Although G-Funk was the most popular variety of hip hop during the early 1990s, the East Coast hip hop scene remained an integral part of the music industry. During this period, several New York City rappers rising from the local underground scene, began releasing noteworthy albums in the early and mid-'90's, such as Nas, The Notorious B.I.G. and others. The Stretch Armstrong and Bobbito Show was the launch pad for many East Coast rappers during this era.

Nas's 1994 debut album Illmatic has also been noted as one of the creative high points of the East Coast hip hop scene, and featured production from such renowned New York-based producers as Large Professor, Pete Rock and DJ Premier. Meanwhile, The Wu-Tang Clan, Onyx, Black Moon, Smif-N-Wessun, Big L, Lost Boyz and Mobb Deep became pillars in New York's hardcore hip hop scene, achieving widespread critical acclaim for their landmark albums, Enter the Wu-Tang (36 Chambers) (1993),  Lifestylez ov da Poor & Dangerous (1995), Enta da Stage (1993), Bacdafucup (1993), Dah Shinin' (1995), Legal Drug Money (1996) and The Infamous (1995).

The Notorious B.I.G. became the central figure in East Coast hip hop during most of the 1990s. Bad Boy Records comprised a team of producers known as the Hitmen Stevie J, Derrick "D Dot" Angelletie and Amen Ra directed by Sean Combs to move the focus on hip hop to New York with the Notorious B.I.G.'s Billboard topping hits. His success on the music charts and rise to the mainstream drew more attention to New York at the time of West Coast hip hop's dominance. According to AllMusic editor Steve Huey, the success of his 1994 debut album Ready to Die "reinvented East Coast rap for the gangsta age" and "turned the Notorious B.I.G. into a hip-hop sensation — the first major star the East Coast had produced since the rise of Dr. Dre's West Coast G-funk". Many saw his dominating presence as a catalyzing factor in the East Coast/West Coast hip hop rivalry that polarized much of the hip hop community, stirring the issue enough to result in the Brooklyn rapper's 1997 death, as well as his West Coast counterpart, Tupac Shakur, months prior.

1997–2007: Bling era, mainstream success
Biggie's commercial success helped pave the way for the success of other up-and-coming East Coast rappers such as Jay-Z, DMX, Busta Rhymes, 50 Cent, Ja Rule, the Lox, Fat Joe and Big Pun.

2007–2013: Blog era and revitalization

A mainstream revitalization of East Coast rap occurred in the late 2000s and early 2010s, albeit without the same level of ubiquity as in the 1990s. Younger artists at this time used Internet resources such as social media, blogging, and music streaming to build a following among fans, blurring the lines between the underground and the mainstream. Rappers who emerged during this  "blog era" include J. Cole (himself a transplant from North Carolina), Joey Bada$$, Nicki Minaj, Wiz Khalifa, Meek Mill, Vast Aire, Wale, Logic, and Azealia Banks.

2013–present: Rise of New York drill and trap
Various factors have led to a decline in unique regional scenes across many musical genres, including East Coast rap. In addition, rivalries between different cities and regions have declined significantly and artists across different regions and genres are much more willing to collaborate than in the past. Despite this, the distinctive East Coast sound is still notable in today's music, often mixed with modern trap sounds. Lil Uzi Vert from Pennsylvania began his career representing the East Coast style, but moved to Atlanta to join others such as Lil Yachty and Playboi Carti, all of whom gained popularity by using online social media.

In addition, New York City's drill movement, heavily influenced by UK drill (and often using the same London producers), has injected new energy into the New York hip hop scene, attracting critical acclaim, media controversy and a significant following, despite departing from standard hip hop song structures. The movement started in Brooklyn, led by artists such as the late Pop Smoke, Fivio Foreign, Sheff G, and 22Gz.

Legacy

East Coast hip hop was the dominant form of rap music during the Golden Era of hip hop. Many knowledgeable hip hop fans and critics are particularly favorable towards East Coast hip hop of the early-mid 1990s, viewing it as a time of creative growth and influential recordings, and describing it as "The East Coast Renaissance". Music writer May Blaize of MVRemix Urban comments on the nostalgia felt among hip hop fans for records released during this time:

David Drake of Stylus Magazine writes of hip hop during 1994 and its contributions, stating: "The beats were hot, the rhymes were hot – it really was an amazing time for hip-hop and music in general. This was the critical point for the East Coast, a time when rappers from the New York area were releasing bucketloads of thrilling work – Digable Planets, Gang Starr, Pete Rock, Jeru, O.C., Organized Konfusion – I mean, this was a year of serious music."

East Coast hip hop has also produced a multitude of highly acclaimed female rappers, including Salt and Pepa who have won one Grammy award, three MTV Video Music Awards, one Soul Train award, and two VH1 hip hop honors, Queen Latifah who has won one Grammy award, one Soul Train Music award, and numerous acting awards, Lil Kim who has won four ASCAP Rhythm & Soul Awards, six BDB Spin Awards, one Billboard Music Award, one New York Music award, four VH1 awards, and has been awarded the key to West Hollywood, and Lauryn Hill who has won over one hundred musical awards and numerous international recognitions, having broken the record for most awards won by a female artist in a single Grammy ceremony and still holds the record for most nominations by a female artist in a single ceremony. Other notable East Coast female rappers include Ladybug Mecca, Lisa "Left Eye" Lopes, Foxy Brown, Charli Baltimore, Eve, Missy Elliott, Angie Martinez, Remy Ma, Lil Mama, Nicki Minaj, and Cardi B, who have all left their impact on the legacy of hip hop.

See also

 Music of New York City
 Culture of New York City
 Music of New Jersey
 Music of Philadelphia
 Music of Baltimore
 Music of Massachusetts
 Music of Delaware
 Music of Washington, D.C.
 Music of Rhode Island
 Music of Connecticut
 Music of Maine
 Music of Virginia
 East Coast–West Coast hip hop rivalry
 List of East Coast hip hop record labels
 Stretch and Bobbito: Radio That Changed Lives

References

External links
 Can't Stop, Won't Stop: A History of the Hip-Hop Generation — By Jeff Chang
 It's Bigger Than Hip Hop — By M. K. Asante, Jr.
 Rap Music and Street Consciousness — By Cheryl L. Keyes

 
1970s in American music
1980s in American music
1990s in American music
2000s in American music
2010s in American music
American hip hop genres
African-American culture
American hip hop scenes